Catterick Bridge is both a bridge across the River Swale in North Yorkshire, England, about 1 mile north of Catterick, and a hamlet at the south end of the bridge.

The bridge 
The bridge carries the A6136 road (once the Great North Road).  It was originally built in 1422, rebuilt probably in the late 16th century and widened in 1792.  It is now a Grade II* listed building.

The hamlet 
The hamlet includes Catterick Racecourse and a few houses, the Sunday market, held at the racecourse, was once the largest of its kind in Northern England. After declining fortunes, the market closed in 2016.

The former Bridge House Hotel currently stands derelict after a fire destroyed a vast majority of Grade II listed building in 2014. There had been a coaching inn at this site since at least the 16th century. After several attempts to auction the property, it was removed from the market in October 2020 due to lack of interest.

Charles Macintosh, the inventor of the Mackintosh raincoat, Sir John Beresford, 1st Baronet and William Beresford, 1st Viscount Beresford were educated at Catterick Bridge.

References

External links

Villages in North Yorkshire
Swaledale
Bridges in North Yorkshire
Grade II* listed buildings in North Yorkshire